Frigyes Gráf (born 17 March 1884, date of death unknown) was a Hungarian gymnast. He competed in the men's artistic individual all-around event at the 1908 Summer Olympics.

References

External links
 

1884 births
Year of death missing
Hungarian male artistic gymnasts
Olympic gymnasts of Hungary
Gymnasts at the 1906 Intercalated Games
Gymnasts at the 1908 Summer Olympics
People from Sopron
Sportspeople from Győr-Moson-Sopron County